Rodionovskaya is a rural locality (a village) in Verkhovskoye Rural Settlement, Verkhovazhsky District, Vologda Oblast, Russia. The population was 15 as of 2002.

Geography 
Rodionovskaya is located 34 km southwest of Verkhovazhye (the district's administrative centre) by road. Osnovinskaya is the nearest rural locality.

References 

Rural localities in Verkhovazhsky District